Lalo Mir is an Argentine radio host.

Works

Radio 
At Radio Del Plata 
 9 P.M.
 Lalo Bla Bla

 At FM Rock & Pop
 Aquí Radio Bangkok
 Buenos Aires, Una Divina Comedia
 Johnny Argentino
 Animal de Radio

At Radio Mitre
 Animados
 Lalo Bla Bla

At La 100
 Lalo por Hecho

At Radio Concierto
 Planeta Piraña

Television 
 La noticia rebelde (ATC, 1988-1989)
 Rock & Pop TV (Canal 11, 1988)
 La Perla de Bangkok (Canal 11, 1988)
 Las patas de la mentira (América TV, 1996-1997)
 Planeta caníbal (América TV, 1997)
 Los osos (El Trece, 2002)
 La Vida es Arte (TV Pública, 2007)
 Monitor TV (Canal Encuentro, 2007)
 Encuentro en el Estudio (Canal Encuentro, 2009-presente)
 Vivo en Argentina (TV Pública, 2011)
 Graduados (Telefe, 2012)
 Viudas e hijos del Rock & Roll (Telefe, 2014)
 Los 90; la década que nos conectó (National Geographic)

Film 
 Cualquiera vencerá (1987)
 Las aventuras de Dios (Eliseo Subiela, 2000)
 Cuando ella saltó (Sabrina Farji, 2007)
 El Arca (2007)

References

Argentine radio presenters
People from Buenos Aires Province
1952 births
Living people